Rovafovir etalafenamide (development code GS-9131) is an experimental drug for the treatment of HIV-1 infection.  Rovafovir etalafenamide is a nucleotide reverse transcriptase inhibitor and prodrug of GS-9148.  Rovafovir etalafenamide itself has no antiviral activity, but once consumed it is metabolized through the hydrolysis of the phosphonoamidate group to generate the antiviral compound GS-9148.

The drug is being developed by Gilead.

Rovafovir etalafenamide shows antiviral activity against viruses containing major mutations associated with resistance to the nucleoside analog reverse-transcriptase inhibitors which are commonly used to treat HIV/AIDS infection.

The methods by which the drug is synthesized by been published.

References 

Reverse transcriptase inhibitors
Experimental drugs
Purines
Dihydrofurans
Ethyl esters
Phosphonate esters